The men's high jump event at the 1979 Summer Universiade was held at the Estadio Olimpico Universitario in Mexico City on 11 and 13 September 1979.

Medalists

Results

Qualification

Final

References

Athletics at the 1979 Summer Universiade
1979